Nesoli (Nesöľ) is a rural locality (a village) in Kosinskoye Rural Settlement, Kosinsky District, Perm Krai, Russia. The population was 43 as of 2010. There are 3 streets.

Geography 
Nesoli is located 25 km north of Kosa (the district's administrative centre) by road. Poroshevo is the nearest rural locality.

References 

Rural localities in Kosinsky District